Herbrand is a surname. Notable people with the surname include:

 Freddy Herbrand (born 1944), Belgian decathlete
 Jacques Herbrand (1908–1931), French mathematician
 Markus Herbrand (born 1971), German politician